Polites carus, the carus skipper, is a species of grass skipper in the butterfly family Hesperiidae.

The MONA or Hodges number for Polites carus is 4015.

References

Further reading

 

Hesperiinae
Articles created by Qbugbot